Juan Gracia Zazueta (April 18, 1901 – October 13, 1981) was a Mexican polo player who competed in the 1936 Summer Olympics.

Born in Quiriego, Sonora, he was captain of the Mexican polo team, which won the bronze medal. He played all three matches in the tournament.

External links

profile

1901 births
1981 deaths
Mexican polo players
Olympic polo players of Mexico
Polo players at the 1936 Summer Olympics
Olympic bronze medalists for Mexico
Medalists at the 1936 Summer Olympics
People from Quiriego Municipality
Sportspeople from Sonora
Olympic medalists in polo